In mathematics, the irrelevant ideal is the ideal of a graded ring generated by the homogeneous elements of degree greater than zero. More generally, a homogeneous ideal of a graded ring is called an irrelevant ideal if its radical contains the irrelevant ideal.

The terminology arises from the connection with algebraic geometry. If R = k[x0, ..., xn] (a multivariate polynomial ring in n+1 variables over an algebraically closed field k) graded with respect to degree, there is a bijective correspondence between projective algebraic sets in projective n-space over k and homogeneous, radical ideals of R not equal to the irrelevant ideal. More generally, for an arbitrary graded ring R, the Proj construction disregards all irrelevant ideals of R.

Notes

References

Sections 1.5 and 1.8 of 

Commutative algebra
Algebraic geometry